The Stronsay Beast was a large globster that washed ashore on the island of Stronsay (at the time spelled Stronsa), in the Orkney Islands, Scotland, after a storm on 25 September 1808. The carcass measured 55 ft (16.8 m) in length, without part of its tail. The Natural History Society (Wernerian Society) of Edinburgh could not identify the carcass and decided it was a new species, probably a sea serpent. The Scottish naturalist Patrick Neill gave it the scientific name Halsydrus pontoppidani (Pontoppidan's sea-snake) in honor of Erik Pontoppidan, who described sea serpents in a work published half a century before.  The anatomist Sir Everard Home in London later dismissed the measurement, declaring it must have been around 36 ft (11 m), and deemed it to be a decayed basking shark. In 1849, Scottish professor John Goodsir in Edinburgh came to the same conclusion.

The Stronsay Beast was measured by a carpenter and two farmers. It was 4 ft (1.2 m) wide and had a circumference of about 10 ft (3.1 m). It had three pairs of appendages described as 'paws' or 'wings'. Its skin was smooth when stroked head to tail and rough when stroked tail to head. Its fins were edged with bristles and it had a row of bristles down its back, which glowed in the dark when wet. Its stomach contents were red.

See also
Zuiyo-maru carcass

References

External links
DNA could help identify 200 year old Stronsay Beast

Globsters
1808 in Scotland
19th century in Orkney
Stronsay
Sea serpents